Gold Rush Maisie is a 1940 drama film, the third of ten films starring Ann Sothern as Maisie Ravier, a showgirl with a heart of gold. In this entry in the series, she joins a gold rush to a ghost town. The film was directed by Edwin L. Marin.

Plot summary

On her way to a job at a café in Truxton, Arizona, singer Maisie Ravier has trouble with her car. She makes her way through an abandoned mining town to get to a nearby ranch, owned by a well-educated but rude and inhospitable young man named Bill Anders. Anders is a recluse by choice; his only company is hired hand Fred Gubbins, who is even more misanthropic than his boss.

Anders warms to the idea of Maisie spending the night while they make up the bed in the guest room. Maisie recognizes the look in his eye. He brings in a bottle and two glasses, and Maisie tell him she never drinks. He keeps pushing, preparing to make a heavy pass, but Maisie tricks him into leaving the room and locks the door. When he threatens to break in, she is not afraid—she says she has left a trail of broken heads "all over the United States, Canada and points west."

In the morning, Maisie sees Anders working on her car and makes breakfast—only to learn that the men have been up for hours and have already eaten. They try unsuccessfully to get her car started, and she sets off for Truxton on foot. Days later, she finally arrives at the café, riding in a wagon driven by a kind old codger, only to find that her job has been given to a hula dancer "in cellophane spinach."

Maisie stops to eat in Harry's greasy spoon. The whole town is buzzing with news of a gold strike not far away, and everyone who can is going there. Harry Gilpin wants to join the rush, but his nagging wife won't let him. A young girl named Jubie Davis comes in and asks Harry to warm up a baby's bottle. He tells her to go away, but Maisie shames him into helping her. Jubie's family is heading for the gold fields, Maisie looks at the pictures in the paper and recognizes the ghost town next to Bill's ranch, and after fending off a lecherous truck driver who wants to give her a lift, heads back there, on foot, figuring that there will be places where she can get a job entertaining the miners. In any case, her car is still there.

The Davis family—mother Sarah, father Bert, Jubie, her always-hungry little brother Harold and baby Gladys—picks her up on the road. They were farmers in Arkansas, victims of the Dust Bowl and Depression who first became tenants on their own land and then lost the farm completely, joining the masses of displaced people moving from state to state to state, from one seasonal picking job to another, with everything they possess stowed in their car. Maisie says to Anders later that she has never known that people had to live like this. She is moved by their kindness and gentle optimism, particularly by the patience and fortitude of Sarah, who quietly goes hungry for the sake of her family, and dreams of having a home so the children can get an education.

The old ghost town is unrecognizable. The streets are packed with people, wagons and trucks and horses. The general store has been put to rights and is piled high with canned goods, selling at exorbitant prices. Maisie spends $5.25 ($ today) to buy groceries for the family, delighting Harold with a can of pork and beans all his own. Several enterprising men have staked claims on large tracts of land, securing everything that is near water, but they aren't digging for gold—they are digging into the already empty pockets of the prospectors by charging $5 to camp. Maisie also learns that there will be no singing jobs in this mining camp. The people here are almost all at the ends of their ropes.

As Davis drives further down the road, Maisie sees Anders’ big new No Trespassing sign. She takes the Davis family to the ranch to camp and won't take no for an answer from Anders. She is outraged to find that Gubbins has dismantled her car to build a wagon (without telling Anders). She gets $10 ($ today) from Anders to compensate her for the car, which should get her started back to Phoenix, but to Jubie's delight Maisie agrees to go partners in prospecting with Davis. Maisie sleeps with Sarah, Jubie and Gladys in their tent, and hears Sarah praying late at night, "Please make it soon."

It turns out that there are several families in the camp who are friends and former neighbors of the Davises. Most of them have found gold and are waiting to learn the value of their claims. Maisie and Davis dig for days without finding anything, but suddenly they strike it, when Maisie loses her temper and wallops the top off an outcropping. Davis plans to buy Sarah a washing machine; Harold wants chocolate candy, chocolate sodas and strawberry pop. There is a dance party to celebrate. Like Bert, many of the men plan to sell their claims to a mining company and start life again with “a nice piece of ground.” All must wait for the assayer to arrive and establish the value of their claims.

In the middle of the night, a violent storm comes in over the ranch, destroying the family's tent and soaking everyone, forcing them to take refuge in Ander's house, very much against his will. Gubbins holds a gun on them at first, but Maisie will have none of that. After the family is safely tucked away for the night, Maisie asks Bill for a hot lemonade "without the spike." She gets out of her wet clothes and wraps herself up in a bathrobe, and Anders brings the drink to her. She can smell the alcohol and refuses. He insists she drink it to keep from getting pneumonia. It takes effect quickly: She tells Anders some things he needs to hear, and learns something about him in turn, as she is more and more under the influence. She assumes that he is miserable because of a woman, but that is not the case. The trouble, never explained, had something to do with his stepfather and brother. “A couple of wrong guys made you swear off the human race.” He accuses her of being "the little friend of all the world" (a phrase used to describe Rudyard Kipling's Kim) "just nuts about everybody." She denies this. She can spot a phony from a mile away with the sun in her eyes and can hate one too with all she's got, but when she runs across swell people, she is nuts about them. She recommends the company of nice people to Anders. Realizing that she is about to fall asleep, she thanks him for everything, for being "awfully awfully awfully kind in a nasty way" and curls up on the sofa. Bill covers her with a blanket.

The next morning, Davis is out in the stableyard admiring the damp soil, which is already sprouting. He tells Anders it would grow anything if it were irrigated. Anders replies that he has plenty of water, and Davis is astonished that he has left the land unused. The assayer has arrived and everyone lines up happily, although they are surprised to have to pay a $2 fee. The hours pass and Anders arrives with a man from the State Bureau of Mines. He has completed the survey they started when the first discovery was made. He reminds them of the history of the town—which is being repeated. Their claims are worthless— it will cost too much to mine and process the gold—and the disappointed Davis family gets ready to go back onto the road, looking for work elsewhere. They gather with 20 other friends to divide up the destinations so they will not be competing with each other.

Anders is unsympathetic toward all these fortune hunters, but Maisie explains to him that everyone in the camp who lost their farms to the dust and foreclosure didn't come looking to find a fortune—they came looking for a way to survive and because they had nowhere else to go. Bill offers the 20 men a deal. They can file as homesteaders on the neighboring government land. They will have two years to prove their claims. He will provide water, supplies and food if they will help him to irrigate his own land as well as their homesteads. They agree, and then spread the word among others in the camp, who turn back joyfully crying, "Turn back. There is farmland."

Jubie is heartbroken to learn that Maisie will not be staying to live with them. Davis gives her their car, which they won't need now that they have a home. Maisie says goodbye to the family, gives Anders a peck on the cheek, and sets off toward Phoenix.

Cast

References

External links
 
 
 
 

1940 films
American drama films
American black-and-white films
Films set in ghost towns
Films directed by Edwin L. Marin
1940 drama films
Metro-Goldwyn-Mayer films
Films set in Arizona
1940s English-language films
1940s American films